Aleksey Sychkov (born 4 February 1992) is a former Belarusian professional football player. After leaving BATE Borisov in late 2012 he played for several futsal clubs.

References

External links
 
 Profile at uefa.com

1992 births
Living people
Belarusian footballers
Association football defenders
FC Savit Mogilev players
FC BATE Borisov players
FC Gorki players
People from Mogilev
Sportspeople from Mogilev Region